Bloemers is a surname. Notable people with the surname include:

Arnoldus Bloemers (1792–1844), Dutch painter
Henk Bloemers (1945–2015), Dutch footballer